Chernopyatovo is a rural locality (a selo) and the administrative center of Chernopyatovsky Selsoviet, Pavlovsky District, Altai Krai, Russia. The population was 620 as of 2013. There are 6 streets.

Geography 
Chernopyatovo is located 21 km northeast Pavlovsk (the district's administrative centre) by road. Nagorny is the nearest rural locality.

References 

Rural localities in Pavlovsky District, Altai Krai